David Moli (born 8 January 1995) is an English former footballer who played as a forward.

Career

As a youth player, Moli joined the youth academy of English third tier side Luton. In 2009, he joined the youth academy of Liverpool in the English Premier League. Before the second half of 2011–12, he joined the youth academy of English second tier club Wolves. In 2015, Moli signed for New Radiant in the Maldives, after trialing for Maltese team Valletta. Before the second half of 2015–16, he signed for Épinal in the French third tier.

In 2017, Moli signed for Welling United in the English sixth tier after trialing for Polish second tier outfit Stomil Olsztyn. After that, he signed for Coventry United in the English ninth tier. In 2018, he signed for Estonian top flight side Vaprus. In 2022, Moli signed for Alsager Town in the English tenth tier.

References

External links
  
 

1995 births
Alsager Town F.C. players
Association football forwards
Boreham Wood F.C. players
Coventry United F.C. players
English expatriate footballers
English expatriate sportspeople in France
English expatriate sportspeople in the Maldives
English footballers
Expatriate footballers in Estonia
Expatriate footballers in France
Expatriate footballers in the Maldives
Hayes & Yeading United F.C. players
Living people
New Radiant S.C. players
Nuneaton Borough F.C. players
Pärnu JK Vaprus players
SAS Épinal players
Welling United F.C. players
English expatriate sportspeople in Estonia